Visar Ymeri (born 11 October 1973) is a Kosovar activist, analyst and politician who served as the deputy leader of the Social Democratic Party of Kosovo. He served as the leader of the Self-Determination movement in Kosovo between 2015 and 2018.

Politics 
Visar Ymeri was one of the leading members of Vetëvendosje, the largest party of Kosovo. In 2010 he was elected as a deputy of Vetëvendosje and was its chairman in the Assembly of Kosovo. He is also a member of the parliamentary committee for economic development, infrastructure, trade and industry.

Visar Ymeri was elected leader of Vetëvendosje on 1 March 2015, at the General Council meeting, winning 97.42% of the vote.

On 2 January 2018, Ymeri resigned as leader of Vetëvendosje, two months before the end of this mandate, following a crisis within the party.

Sources 

Albanian politicians
Kosovo Albanians
Kosovan politicians
Politics of Kosovo
1973 births
Living people
Vetëvendosje politicians
Leaders of political parties